The SpVgg Hankofen-Hailing is a German association football club from the villages of Hankofen and Hailing in the municipality of Leiblfing, Bavaria.

The club's greatest success came in 2022 when it qualified for Regionalliga Bayern, in the fourth tier of the German football league system.

History
For most of its history the club has been a nondescript amateur side in local Bavarian football. The club's rise began in 1992 when it was promoted to the Kreisklasse Dingolfing in which it finished runners-up in 1993 and 1994 before winning promotion to the Bezirksliga in 1995.

Thirty years after its formation, the club rose to the highest league in Lower Bavaria, the Bezirksoberliga Niederbayern, for the first time in 1998 on the strength of a Bezirksliga Niederbayern-West title and played at that level for the next three seasons. SpVgg immediately became a strong side at this level, finishing sixth in its first season and fourth in its second and won the league in its third. The latter allowed the club to move up to the Landesliga Bayern-Mitte, where it would play for the next five seasons. After a difficult first year, the club finished in the upper half of the table for the second, third and fourth seasons there but was relegated in 2006 after finishing 15th.

SpVgg bounced back immediately, winning the Bezirksoberliga again and returning to the Landesliga. It was unable to establish itself however, finished 16th, and was relegated again. Two more seasons in the Bezirksoberliga followed before the club won a third league title there and moved up to the Landesliga again. This third title also equaled SpVgg GW Deggendorf's record of three titles in the Bezirksoberliga Niederbayern, which no other club achieved until the league was disbanded in 2012.

Back in the Landesliga SpVgg performed much better as in the past, coming fourth in its first year there. The second season, the last of the league in its current format, saw a sixth-place finish and allowed the club to move up to the southern division of the newly expanded Bayernliga.

In its first Bayernliga season, the club came tenth, followed by a seventh place in 2013–14 and a sixth place the year after.

The club won promotion to the Regionalliga Bayern in the 2021–22, finishing first in the Bayernliga Süd.

Honours
The club's honours:

League
 Bayernliga Süd (V)
 Champions: 2022
 Bezirksoberliga Niederbayern
 Champions: 2001 (VI), 2007 (VI), 2010 (VII)
 Bezirksliga Niederbayern-West (VII)
 Champions: 1998

Cup

 Niederbayern Cup
 Runners-up: 2001, 2004, 2005

Recent seasons
The recent season-by-season performance of the club:

With the introduction of the Bezirksoberligas in 1988 as the new fifth tier, below the Landesligas, all leagues below dropped one tier. With the introduction of the Regionalligas in 1994 and the 3. Liga in 2008 as the new third tier, below the 2. Bundesliga, all leagues below dropped one tier. With the establishment of the Regionalliga Bayern as the new fourth tier in Bavaria in 2012 the Bayernliga was split into a northern and a southern division, the number of Landesligas expanded from three to five and the Bezirksoberligas abolished. All leagues from the Bezirksligas onwards were elevated one tier.

Key

References

External links
 Official team site  
 Das deutsche Fußball-Archiv  historical German domestic league tables
 Manfreds Fussball Archiv  Tables and results from the Bavarian amateur leagues
 SpVgg Hankofen-Hailing at Weltfussball.de  

Football clubs in Germany
Football clubs in Bavaria
Football in Lower Bavaria
Association football clubs established in 1968
1968 establishments in West Germany
Straubing-Bogen